The 12th Beijing College Student Film Festival took place in Beijing, China in May 2005. Kekexili: Mountain Patrol was the biggest winner, receiving two awards, including Best Director and Grand Prix Award. Xia Yu won Best Actor for his performance in Waiting Alone, and Zhang Jingchu for her role in Huayao Bride In Shangri-la. Golden Rooster-winner Lu Chuan's Kekexili: Mountain Patrol won Best Director Award, and A Story of Dun Zi was declared Best Film Award.

Winners and nominees

References

External links
  12th Beijing College Student Film Festival Sina
 12th Beijing College Student Film Festival Tencent

12
2005 film festivals
2005 festivals in Asia
Bei